Ishvari (Sanskrit: ईश्वरी, IAST: Īśvarī) is a Hindu epithet of Sanskrit origin, referring to the Goddess, the divine female counterpart of Ishvara. It is also a term that refers to the shakti, or the feminine energy of the Trimurti, which refer to Saraswati, Lakshmi, and Parvati.

Etymology

The root of the word is the Sanskrit syllable īś, "to be valid or powerful ; to be master of", joined with vara, "select, choicest, valuable, precious, best, most excellent or eminent among"  When referring to divine as female, particularly in Shaktism, the feminine  is sometimes used.

References

Hindu goddesses
Forms of Parvati